Munir Ahmed (born 10 November 1970) is an Austrian former cricketer. He was part of the Austrian team at the 2011 ICC European T20 Championship Division One tournament.

References

1970 births
Living people
Austrian cricketers
Place of birth missing (living people)